The Jamaica National League is a rugby league competition held annually in Jamaica. It is one of two leagues in Jamaica, the other being the Jamaica Premiership. It started in 2005 when four teams entered the competition and has since grown to six. Currently the league is sponsored by Globe Insurance.

Structure

The five teams each play two games against each other, one at home and one away. At the end of those eight matches the top two teams will play in the Grand Final and be the overall winners. Points are awarded as follow: 4 points for a win, 2 points for a draw and 1 point for a loss.

Originally in 2005, when there were only four teams, each team would only play three games each. A larger fixture list was added for the 2006 season because the previous season had been deemed a success despite the small number of games.

Teams

There are eight teams in the league. The Constabulary Knights and the Montego Bay Cobras are the newest teams having joined for the 2006 and 2008 season respectively. All the teams, minus the Montego Bay Cobras, are based around the Jamaican capital Kingston, although progress is being made to expand rugby league across Jamaica. The teams are:

Seasons

2005

The 2005 season was won by the Vauxhall Vultures on points difference. Three teams finished on 9 points which was one of the criticisms of the league because only three matches had been played. Olympic Angels failed to register a single point. The competition was played on three Saturdays at the end of July and the beginning of August.

Table

 Vauxhall Vultures P:3, +28, Pts:9
 JDF Warriors P:3, +26, Pts:9
 Duhaney Park Sharks P:3, -12, Pts:9
 Olympic Angels P:3, -42, Pts:3

2006

The 2006 season was won by the JDF Warriors after earning maximum points. Duhaney Park Sharks and Vauxhall Vultures were regularly battling it out for second place, with the other two teams, including newly created Constabulary Knights, fighting to not receive the wooden spoon. The first draw of the whole competition occurred between Duhaney Park Sharks and Constabulary Knights. Also Olympic Angels managed their first win and only win in the competition.

Table

 JDF Warriors P:8, +248, Pts:32
 Duhaney Park Sharks P:8, +70, Pts:24
 Vauxhall Vultures P:8, +45, Pts:20
 Constabulary Knights P:8, -202, Pts:12
 Olympic Angels P:8, -161, Pts:11

Player Records

 Highest Try Scorer: Mohenjo Thompson, Vauxhall Vultures, 18 tries.
 Highest Overall Points Scorer: Mohenjo Thompson, Vauxhall Vultures, 138 points overall.

See also

 Rugby league in the Americas
 Jamaica national rugby league team

References

External links

Rugby league competitions
Rugby league in Jamaica
Sports leagues established in 2005
2005 establishments in Jamaica